G-protein coupled receptor 143 is a protein encoded by the GPR143 gene in humans.

Ocular albinism type 1 protein is a conserved integral membrane protein with seven transmembrane domains.  It is expressed in the eye and epidermal melanocytes.

The GPR143 gene is regulated by the Microphthalmia-associated transcription factor.

L-DOPA is an endogenous ligand for OA1.

Interactions
GPR143 has been shown to interact with GNAI1.

References

Further reading

External links
  GeneReviews/NCBI/NIH/UW entry on Ocular Albinism, X-Linked

G protein-coupled receptors